Northwest Orient Airlines Flight 710, a Lockheed L-188 Electra, disintegrated in-flight and crashed near Cannelton, Indiana (10 miles east of Tell City, Indiana) on March 17, 1960. The flight carried 57 passengers and six crew members. There were no survivors.

Crash and causes

The seven-month-old Lockheed L-188C Electra operating as Northwest Orient Flight 710 (the airline's first Electra) was a regularly scheduled flight departing Minneapolis-St. Paul to Miami with a stop at Chicago Midway Airport. Radio contact with the Indianapolis Control Center was made at approximately 3:00 p.m. local time. About 15 minutes later, witnesses reported seeing the airplane break into two pieces, with the right wing falling as one piece and the remainder of the craft plunging to earth near Cannelton in southern Indiana.

The crash was the third disaster involving an Electra aircraft in a little more than a year and the tenth major aircraft disaster of 1960, with nearly 400 people killed in less than three months. It came within days of the Washington, D.C. hearings on the death of 34 people in a National Airlines plane crash near Bolivia, North Carolina (later discovered to have been the result of a bomb). 
 
Civil Aeronautics Board (CAB) investigators focused on three possible causes: a bomb, air turbulence and metal fatigue. Violent air turbulence had been reported over southern Indiana at about the time of the crash, and metal fatigue had recently caused other crashes.

"Obviously, this plane broke up in the air," CAB spokesman Edward Slattery said, "It is too early to tell the cause of the tragedy, but we will investigate all possibilities, including a bomb."

The Associated Press reported that at 5:44 p.m., 90 minutes after news of the crash, an anonymous caller had informed Chicago police that a bomb had been placed on board a plane at Midway Airport. The police investigated but found nothing and concluded that the call was a prank.

The plane plunged from a height of 18,000 feet into an Ohio River country farm at a speed of more than 600 miles per hour and disintegrated. FBI agents were dispatched to the scene to determine whether any violation of federal law had occurred, such as sabotage, and to assist with fingerprint identification of victims.

Because a great deal of wreckage had fallen over a wide area as the aircraft plunged, investigators first suspected that two planes had collided. State police faced great difficulty reaching the main crash site because of the area's thickly wooded, steep hills and a scarcity of roads in the vicinity. Rescuers discovered a scene of devastation with no survivors. A policeman at the scene remarked: "We haven't really found anything that you could count a body." Some victims were identified by dental records, but most were never positively identified.

NASA, Boeing and Lockheed engineers determined that the probable cause was the structural failure and in-flight separation of the right wing while cruising at  resulting from flutter caused by unexplained reduced stiffness of the engine mounts. This was subsequently defined as "whirl mode," a design weakness that Lockheed engineers termed a "freak vibration phenomenon." This second similar crash moved the Federal Aviation Administration to immediately issue a reduced cruise-speed directive while investigators tried to determine the cause of the fatal crashes.

The CAB's final report was issued more than a year after the disaster and concurred with the conclusions reached by Lockheed in its investigation.

Notable victims 
Chiyoki Ikeda, 39, a CIA training commander

Kiwanis Electra Memorial 

The citizens of Perry County and the Cannelton Kiwanis Club raised funds for a memorial at the site of the 1960 crash. Dedicated in 1961, the Kiwanis Electra Memorial stands on Millstone Road in Tobin Township.

Cannelton newspaper editor and civic booster Bob Cummings wrote the words that are inscribed on the memorial along with the names of those who died. The inscription reads: "This memorial, dedicated to the memory of 63 persons who died in an airplane crash at this location, March 17, 1960, was erected by public subscription in the hope that such tragedies will be eliminated."

See also
List of accidents and incidents involving commercial aircraft

References

External links 
 CAB Aircraft Accident Report on Northwest Orient Airlines Flight 710
 
Newspaper article recalling 50 years of service in maintaining the memorial site by local residents
Comprehensive details of accident with additional references and authentic video simulation of crash

Aviation accidents and incidents in the United States in 1960
Airliner accidents and incidents in Indiana
Airliner accidents and incidents caused by in-flight structural failure
Disasters in Indiana
Accidents and incidents involving the Lockheed L-188 Electra
Monuments and memorials in Indiana
Buildings and structures in Perry County, Indiana
1960 in Indiana
710
March 1960 events in the United States
Perry County, Indiana